Madonna of the Fish, known also as Madonna with the Fish is a painting by the High Renaissance master Raphael. 

Mary sits enthroned with the Jesus on her knee. On one side is St. Jerome kneeling by the Lion; he is holding a book. On the other side the archangel Raphael is presenting at the foot of the throne the young Tobias, whom he formerly guided to the River Tigris, and who bears the miraculous fish whose heart, liver and gall were to restore his father's sight, and drive the demons from his bride. Tobias with his fish was an early type of baptism. Raphael leading Tobias always expresses protection, and especially protection to the young. The picture is believed to have been painted around 1512–1514 to commemorate the introduction of Book of Tobit to the canonical books of the Roman Catholic Church. St. Jerome translated the Book of Tobit into Latin, which explains his presence on the right of Mary.

It is currently held by the Museo del Prado, Madrid.

See also
List of paintings by Raphael

Notes

References

External links

1510s paintings
Paintings of the Madonna and Child by Raphael
Lions in art
Raphael
Fish in art
Paintings of Raphael (archangel)
Paintings depicting Tobias
Books in art